
Randel may refer to:

People

Given name
Randel (given name), a masculine given name in the English language

Surname
Andreas Randel (1806–1864), Swedish composer and violinist
Don Michael Randel (born 1940), American musicologist
John Randel, Jr. (1787–1865), American surveyor
Matt Randel (born 1977), American-Korean baseball player
Tony Randel (born 1956), American film director and screenwriter

See also
 Randell
 Randle
 Randall (disambiguation)

English-language surnames